Mountain Province is a landlocked province of the Philippines in the Cordillera Administrative Region in Luzon. Its capital is Bontoc. Mountain Province was formerly referred to as Mountain in some foreign references. The name is usually shortened by locals to Mt. Province. 

The province was named so for being in the Cordillera Central mountain range found in the upper realms of Luzon island.

Mountain Province was also the name of the historical province that included most of the current Cordillera provinces. This old province was established by the Philippine Commission in 1908, and was later split in 1966 into Mountain Province, Benguet, Kalinga-Apayao and Ifugao.

The province is also known for its mummy caves, which contain naturally mummified bodies, and for its hanging coffins.

History

Spanish period
The area of the Cordillera mountains proved difficult to control by the Spaniards. During the long Spanish rule, not much was done to bring the province under control. From 1566 to 1665, they sent expeditions to conquer the land but the rugged terrain and hostile indigenous population at the time were major obstacles to complete subjugation. The first serious effort to subjugate them was made in 1785 when soldiers were sent from Cagayan to put down a revolt of the Kalingas. A famous Spanish explorer, Guillermo Galvez, conducted more than 40 forays to the mountainous region.

Formerly called La Montañosa by the Spanish colonizers due to its mountainous terrain, the area was subdivided into 6 comandancias politico-militar.

American period

On August 19, 1908, during the American rule, the Philippine Commission enacted Act No. 1876, which organized the entire area of the Cordilleras into one large province, named Mountain Province.

The first governor was Samuel Cane, and the town of Bontoc was made the capital. It was originally composed of the sub-provinces of Amburayan, Apayao, Benguet, Lepanto-Bontoc, Ifugao and Kalinga.

Amburayan was later abolished in 1920 and its corresponding territories were transferred to the provinces of Ilocos Sur and La Union. Lepanto was also reduced in size and its towns were integrated into the sub-provinces of Bontoc and Benguet, and to the province of Ilocos Sur.

Post-war era
Effective on April 7, 1967, Republic Act No. 4695 abolished the old Mountain Province, converting its sub-provinces into 4 independent provinces: Benguet, Ifugao, Kalinga-Apayao and Mountain Province (corresponding to the former Bontoc sub-province).

Mountain Province would have been significantly affected by the Chico River Dam Project during the Marcos dictatorship, as the Marcos administration's project would have flooded the municipalities of Sabangan, Sagada, Sadanga, Bontoc, Bauko, and parts of Barlig.  However, the indigenous peoples of Kalinga Province and Mountain Province resisted the project and when hostilities resulted in the murder of Macli-ing Dulag, the project became unpopular and was abandoned before Marcos was ousted by the 1986 People Power Revolution.

On June 15, 1987, the Cordillera Administrative Region was established upon the issuance of Executive Order 220 by then-President Corazon Aquino, and Mountain Province was made one of its provinces.

Geography
Mountain Province covers a total area of  occupying the central section of the Cordillera Administrative Region in Luzon. The province is bordered on the north by Kalinga, south by Ifugao, southwest by Benguet, west by Ilocos Sur, and northwest by Abra.

Situated within the Cordillera Central, Mountain Province is 83% mountainous while 17% make up hills and levels. The province has many rivers, waterfalls, mountains, and caves. The central and western areas of the province are characterized by rugged mountains and steep cliffs, while the eastern portion has generally sloping terrain.

Administrative divisions
Mountain Province comprises ten municipalities, all encompassed by a lone legislative district.

Barangays
Mountain Province has 144 barangays comprising its 10 municipalities.

As of 2010, the most populous barangay in the province is Poblacion in the municipality of Paracelis, with a total of 5,687 inhabitants. Balintaugan in the municipality of Bauko has the least population with only 144.

Demographics

Based on the 2000 census survey, Kankana-ey comprised   of the total provincial population of 140,339.

Religion

Anglicanism predominates in the province with approximately 60% adherence with the other religions such as Roman Catholicism, Seventh-Day Adventist Church, Iglesia Filipina Indepiendente, Iglesia ni Cristo and Free Believers in Christ Fellowship.

Mountain Province is the only predominantly Protestant province in the Philippines.

Economy

Tourism
The province has several rice terraces in seven of its different towns:

 Ambatukan Rice Terraces — Sagada
 Ambasing Rice Terraces — Sagada
 Bangaan Rice Terraces — Sagada
 Bangen Rice Terraces — Bauko
 Barlig Rice Terraces — Barlig
 Bayyo Rice Terraces — Bontoc
 Besao Rice Terraces — Besao
 Bontoc Poblacion Rice Terraces — Bontoc
 Bucas Rice Terraces — Besao
 Bulongan Rice Terraces — Sagada
 Dalican Rice Terraces — Bontoc
 Fidelisan Rice Terraces — Sagada
 Focong Rice Terraces — Sadanga
 Kapayawan Rice Terraces — Bauko
 Kiltepan Rice Terraces — Sagada
 Maligcong Rice Terraces — Bontoc
 Natonin Rice Terraces — Natonin
 Sadanga Rice Terraces — Sadanga
 Suyo Rice Terraces — Sagada
 Tanulong Rice Terraces — Sagada

The mountainous province also offers excellent mountain climbing experiences with two of its mountains among the top 10 highest points in the Philippines:
 Mount Kalawitan, 2,714+msl - Sabangan
 Mount Amuyao or Mount Finaroy, 2,702+msl - Barlig

Government

List of governors
 2001–2004 — Sario M. Malinias
 2004–2010 — Maximo B. Dalog
 2010–2016 — Leonard G. Mayaen
 2016–present — Bonifacio C. Lacwasan Jr.

References

External links

 
 

 
Provinces of the Philippines
Provinces of the Cordillera Administrative Region
States and territories established in 1908
1908 establishments in the Philippines